Leon Gawanke (born 31 May 1999) is a German professional ice hockey player for the Manitoba Moose of the American Hockey League (AHL) as a prospect under contract to the Winnipeg Jets of the National Hockey League (NHL). He represents the German national team.

Playing career
He was drafted 136th overall in the 2017 NHL Entry Draft by the Winnipeg Jets and signed an entry-level contract on 23 May 2019.

International play
He represented Germany at the 2021 IIHF World Championship.

Career statistics

Regular season and playoffs

International

References

External links
 

1999 births
Living people
Cape Breton Screaming Eagles players
Eisbären Berlin players
Expatriate ice hockey players in the United States
German expatriate ice hockey people
German expatriate sportspeople in the United States
German ice hockey defencemen
Ice hockey people from Berlin
Manitoba Moose players
Winnipeg Jets draft picks